Strukov is a municipality and village in Olomouc District in the Olomouc Region of the Czech Republic. It has about 200 inhabitants.

Geography
It lies in the Upper Morava Valley.

History
Strukov was founded in 1789.

References

Villages in Olomouc District